Velyka Byihan is a village in Zakarpattia Oblast (province) of western Ukraine.

Geography
The village is located around 6 km northwest of Berehove along the brook Vérke. Administratively, the village belongs to the Berehove Raion, Zakarpattia Oblast.

Villages in Berehove Raion